Hall of Fame is a live album by the progressive rock band the Moody Blues.  It was recorded at a concert performed at the Royal Albert Hall, which included backing by a live orchestra.  The album was released on 8 August 2000.  It is the second Moody Blues live album to feature a live orchestra, with the first being A Night at Red Rocks with the Colorado Symphony Orchestra.
This is the last live release to feature Ray Thomas.
A decade on, all but "Overture" and "Legend of a Mind" appeared on the budget release Live at the Royal Albert Hall with the World Festival Orchestra released by Sony Music Custom Marketing Group in the United States. The concert is also available on DVD.

Track listing
All songs by Justin Hayward, except where noted.

 "Overture" (Ray Thomas, Hayward) – 3:58 (features excerpts from "Legend of a Mind", "Tuesday Afternoon", and "Nights in White Satin")
 "Tuesday Afternoon" – 4:30
 "English Sunset" – 5:16
 "Words You Say" (John Lodge) – 5:13
 "The Story in Your Eyes" – 3:47
 "I Know You're Out There Somewhere" – 5:25
 "Haunted" – 4:14
 "Your Wildest Dreams" – 4:54
 "Isn't Life Strange" (Lodge) – 5:50
 "I'm Just a Singer (In a Rock and Roll Band)" (Lodge)  – 6:26
 "Nights in White Satin"  - 6:59
 "Legend of a Mind" (Ray Thomas) – 6:01
 "Question" – 6:14
 "Ride My See-Saw" (Lodge) – 5:07

Personnel
Justin Hayward – guitars, vocals
John Lodge – bass guitar, vocals
Ray Thomas – flutes, percussion, vocals
Graeme Edge – drums, percussion

Additional personnel
Paul Bliss – keyboards
Bias Boshell – keyboards
Tracy Graham – backing vocals
Gordon Marshall – drums
Sue Shattock – backing vocals
The World Festival Orchestra

Charts

Certifications

References

The Moody Blues live albums
2000 live albums
Live albums recorded at the Royal Albert Hall